George Curme may refer to:
 George Oliver Curme (1860–1948), American linguist
 George O. Curme Jr. (1888–1976), his son, American industrial chemist